Jack Elliott Sings the Songs of Woody Guthrie is an album by American folk musician Ramblin' Jack Elliott, released in September 1960. It consists of songs written or well known as performed by Woody Guthrie.

Reception

Writing for Allmusic, music critic Richie Unterberger called the album "the recording that is most representative of his role in popularizing the work of his hero."

Reissues
Jack Elliott Sings the Songs of Woody Guthrie was reissued along with Ramblin' Jack Elliott in 1989 as a double LP on the Fantasy label as Hard Travelin'. It was reissued on CD in 1991 with "I Love Her So/I Got a Woman" omitted.

Track listing

Side one
"Hard Traveling"
"Grand Coulee Dam"
"New York Town"
"Tom Joad"
"Howdido"
"Talking Dust Bowl"
"This Land is Your Land"

Side two
"Pretty Boy Floyd"
"Philadelphia Lawyer"
"Talking Columbia"
"Dust Storm Disaster"
"Riding in My Car"
"1913 Massacre"
"So Long"

Personnel
Ramblin' Jack Elliott – vocals, harmonica, guitar
Rudy Van Gelder - recording and mastering

References

External links
Ramblin' Jack Elliott Illustrated discography

1960 albums
Ramblin' Jack Elliott albums
Woody Guthrie tribute albums
Prestige Records albums
EMI Records albums